Yates County Courthouse Park District is a national historic district located at Penn Yan in Yates County, New York. The district consists of two acres and contains the Yates County Courthouse, First Baptist Church, the County Office Building, the Old Jail, and the Courthouse Park.  The park includes a Civil War monument to the 2,109 county soldiers who served in the war.

It was listed on the National Register of Historic Places in 1979 and, since 1985, has been contained entirely within the larger Penn Yan Historic District.

Gallery

References

Historic districts on the National Register of Historic Places in New York (state)
County courthouses in New York (state)
Historic districts in Yates County, New York
National Register of Historic Places in Yates County, New York
Courthouses on the National Register of Historic Places in New York (state)